Ebenezer Ackon (born 2 December 1996) is a Ghanaian footballer who plays as a defender for San Diego Loyal in the USL Championship.

Career statistics

Club

Notes

References

External links
 Ebenezer Ackon at the Bowling Green State University

1996 births
Living people
Ghanaian footballers
Ghanaian expatriate footballers
Association football defenders
Bowling Green Falcons men's soccer players
San Antonio FC players
San Diego Loyal SC players
Ghanaian expatriate sportspeople in the United States
Expatriate soccer players in the United States
Chicago Fire FC draft picks
USL Championship players